Joey Silvera (born December 20, 1951) is an American pornographic film director and former actor.

He has been involved in the pornographic industry since the early 1970s. A native of upstate New York, he first started performing in San Francisco in 1974, and went on to appear in more than 1,000 videos. In the early 1990s, Silvera went on to direct videos for his own company.  His movies were first distributed by Devil's Film, and he later was invited to join John Stagliano's Evil Angel.

Career 
He is a member of the AVN and XRCO Halls of Fame.

Awards 
As a performer:
1984 XRCO Best Supporting Actor for Public Affairs
1985 XRCO Best Supporting Actor for She's So Fine
1987 AVN Best Supporting Actor – Video for She's So Fine
1987 AVN Best Couples Sex Scene – Video for Blame it on Ginger
1988 AVN Best Couples Sex Scene – Video for Made in Germany
1993 AVN Best Supporting Actor – Film for Facedance 1 and 2
1993 AVN Best Actor – Video for The Party
1993 AVN Best Couples Sex Scene – Video for The Party
1994 XRCO Best Group Scene for Buttman's British Moderately Bit Tit Adventure

As a director:
1996 XRCO Best Series for Joey Silvera's Butt Row
1997 AVN Best Gonzo Series for Butt Row
1999 AVN Best Transsexual Release for The Big-Ass She-Male Adventure'
1999 XRCO Best Gonzo Series for Please!2000 AVN Best Transsexual Release for Rogue Adventures 3: Big-Ass She-Male Adventure2000 XRCO Best Gonzo Series for Please!2001 AVN Best Gonzo Release for Please! 122001 AVN Best Gonzo Series for Please!2001 AVN Best Transsexual Release for Rogue Adventures 3: Big-Ass She-Male Adventure 72001 XRCO Best Gonzo Series for Service Animals2002 AVN Best Transsexual Release for Rogue Adventures 132003 AVN Best Transsexual Release for Rogue Adventures 152004 AVN Best Gonzo Release for Service Animals2004 XRCO Best Gonzo Series for Service Animals2005 XRCO Best Gonzo Series for Service Animals2006 AVN Best Transsexual Release for Rogue Adventures 242006 XRCO Best Gonzo Series for Service Animals2007 AVN Best Transsexual Release for Rogue Adventures 272012 XBIZ Award – Transsexual Release of the Year for She-Male Police 22012 XBIZ Award – Transsexual Director of the Year
2014 XBIZ Award – Transsexual Director of the Year
2015 XBIZ Award – Transsexual Release of the Year for Big Tit She-Male X 22015 XBIZ Award – Transsexual Director of the Year

 Further reading 
Nicolas Barbano: Verdens 25 hotteste pornostjerner'' (Rosinante, Denmark 1999)  (features a chapter on Joey Silvera)

References

External links 

 
 
 
 

American male pornographic film actors
1951 births
Living people
Male actors from New York City
American pornographers
American pornographic film directors
Directors of transgender pornographic films
Transgender Erotica Award winners
Transgender erotica